The Wells River Bridge between Wells River, Vermont and Woodsville, New Hampshire, is a steel double-decked Baltimore truss bridge over the Connecticut River.  It was built in 1903 to carry rail and road traffic.

History
The first bridge at this crossing was built in 1805.  In 1853, the Boston, Concord, & Montreal Railroad built a double-decked wooden Burr truss covered bridge over the Connecticut River on this alignment.  The railroad collected tolls from users of the highway.

The current Wells River Bridge was built in 1903 by the Boston & Maine Railroad, which took over the route, to carry rail and road traffic, to replace the previous bridge.  In 1917, the road traffic was rerouted over a new bridge just downstream, called the Ranger Bridge.  The railroad continued to use this bridge until no later than 2001, when it was used for vehicle traffic while the Ranger Bridge was being rehabilitated.  As of 2007, this bridge is fenced off and unused.

See also 
 List of crossings of the Connecticut River

References

Bridges over the Connecticut River
Woodsville, New Hampshire
Wells River, Vermont
Bridges completed in 1903
Bridges in Grafton County, New Hampshire
Bridges in Orange County, Vermont
Road bridges in New Hampshire
Road bridges in Vermont
Steel bridges in the United States
Buildings and structures in Newbury, Vermont
Interstate vehicle bridges in the United States
1903 establishments in Vermont
1903 establishments in New Hampshire
Baltimore truss bridges